Venango may refer to:

Places in the United States
 Venango, Kansas, an unincorporated community
 Venango, Nebraska, a village
 Venango County, Pennsylvania
 Venango, Pennsylvania, a borough
 Venango Township, Butler County, Pennsylvania
 Venango Township, Crawford County, Pennsylvania
 Venango Township, Erie County, Pennsylvania
 Fort Venango, Pennsylvania, a British fort from 1760 to 1763

Other uses
 , a US Navy attack cargo ship
 Venango Regional Airport, Venango County, Pennsylvania, a public airport
 Venango Catholic High School, a private, Roman Catholic high school in Oil City, Pennsylvania

See also
 Venango Formation, a geologic formation in Pennsylvania
 Venango Path, a Native American path in Pennsylvania